Gulzar Mahal is a palace in the city of Bahawalpur, Pakistan.

History
Gulzar Mahal was built between 1906 and 1909. It was commissioned during the reign of Sadeq Mohammad Khan V, and was built to be the residence for women members of the royal household of the former princely state of Bahawalpur, aside from the Queen. The palace is surrounded by a large garden, and is located in the Bahawalgarh Palace Complex in close proximity to the palaces of Darbar Mahal, Farrukh Mahal, and Nishat Mahal. 

The palace has been leased by the armed forces since 1966, and is currently not open to the general public. The architectural design of this Palace blends the European and Indian styles together, with classical touch of pristine white color.

References 

Bahawalpur (princely state)
1909 establishments in British India
Palaces in Pakistan
Buildings and structures completed in 1909
Tourist attractions in Bahawalpur
Buildings and structures in Bahawalpur
Royal residences in Pakistan